Direct address may refer to:

 Vocative expression, a term or phrase used to directly address an individual
 The direct addressing mode in computer programming
 Breaking the fourth wall in theatre